Cârțișoara (also Cârța Românească;) is a commune in Sibiu County, Transylvania, Romania. It is composed of a single village, Cârțișoara. Bâlea Lake is located on the territory of Cârțișoara.

Cârțișoara is situated at the western edge of Țara Făgărașului, on the northern side of the Southern Carpathians, at the foot of the Făgăraș Mountains; it lies on the border with Argeș County and near the borders with Vâlcea and Brașov counties. The commune sits on the left bank of the river Cârțișoara, which flows south to north, discharging into the Olt River.

At the 2011 census, Cârțișoara had a population of 1,243 inhabitants, of which 96.3% were ethnic Romanians.

Natives
Badea Cârțan

References

Communes in Sibiu County
Localities in Transylvania